The First Congregational Church, located at 202 N. Bluff Ave. in Anthony, Kansas, was completed in 1910, replacing the 1880 first church of the congregation.  It was listed on the National Register of Historic Places in 2014.

It includes Gothic Revival architecture.  It has three crenelated towers.

References

Churches on the National Register of Historic Places in Kansas
Gothic Revival architecture in Kansas
Churches completed in 1910
Harper County, Kansas